The 1998–99 Pittsburgh Penguins season was the Penguins' 32nd season in the National Hockey League (NHL).

Offseason

Regular season 

The Penguins were the least penalized team during the regular season, with just 302 power-play opportunities against. They also allowed the most short-handed goals, with 14.

Final standings

Schedule and results 

|-  style="background:#cfc;"
| 1 || 10 || Pittsburgh Penguins || 4–3 || New York Islanders || 1–0–0 || 2
|-  style="background:#cfc;"
| 2 || 14 || Pittsburgh Penguins || 3–1 || New Jersey Devils || 2–0–0 || 4
|-  style="background:#ffc;"
| 3 || 17 || New York Rangers || 3–3 || Pittsburgh Penguins || 2–0–1 || 5
|-  style="background:#fcf;"
| 4 || 21 || Pittsburgh Penguins || 0–5 || Tampa Bay Lightning || 2–1–1 || 5
|-  style="background:#fcf;"
| 5 || 24 || Toronto Maple Leafs || 6–6 || Pittsburgh Penguins || 2–2–1 || 5
|-  style="background:#cfc;"
| 6 || 26 || Pittsburgh Penguins || 2–0 || Toronto Maple Leafs || 3–2–1 || 7
|-  style="background:#cfc;"
| 7 || 28 || Pittsburgh Penguins || 5–2 || Calgary Flames || 4–2–1 || 9
|-  style="background:#ffc;"
| 8 || 30 || Pittsburgh Penguins || 2–2 || Vancouver Canucks || 4–2–2 || 10
|-  style="background:#fcf;"
| 9 || 31 || Pittsburgh Penguins || 1–4 || Edmonton Oilers || 4–3–2 || 10
|-

|-  style="background:#ffc;"
| 10 || 3 || Philadelphia Flyers || 4–4 || Pittsburgh Penguins || 4–3–3 || 11
|-  style="background:#cfc;"
| 11 || 5 || Pittsburgh Penguins || 4–2 || Ottawa Senators || 5–3–3 || 13
|-  style="background:#ffc;"
| 12 || 7 || Boston Bruins || 0–0 || Pittsburgh Penguins || 5–3–4 || 14
|-  style="background:#cfc;"
| 13 || 10 || New York Islanders || 2–2 || Pittsburgh Penguins || 6–3–4 || 16
|-  style="background:#fcf;"
| 14 || 13 || Pittsburgh Penguins || 3–4 || New Jersey Devils || 6–4–4 || 16
|-  style="background:#cfc;"
| 15 || 14 || Florida Panthers || 0–0 || Pittsburgh Penguins || 7–4–4 || 18
|-  style="background:#fcf;"
| 16 || 17 || Philadelphia Flyers || 4–4 || Pittsburgh Penguins || 7–5–4 || 18
|-  style="background:#cfc;"
| 17 || 19 || Pittsburgh Penguins || 5–1 || Tampa Bay Lightning || 8–5–4 || 20
|-  style="background:#cfc;"
| 18 || 21 || Tampa Bay Lightning || 2–2 || Pittsburgh Penguins || 9–5–4 || 22
|-  style="background:#fcf;"
| 19 || 25 || Pittsburgh Penguins || 4–5 || Washington Capitals || 9–6–4 || 22
|-  style="background:#ffc;"
| 20 || 27 || New York Rangers || 2–2 || Pittsburgh Penguins || 9–6–5 || 23
|-  style="background:#cfc;"
| 21 || 28 || Pittsburgh Penguins || 4–3 || Montreal Canadiens || 10–6–5 || 25
|-

|-  style="background:#ffc;"
| 22 || 1 || Mighty Ducks of Anaheim || 4–4 || Pittsburgh Penguins || 10–6–6 || 26
|-  style="background:#ffc;"
| 23 || 4 || Pittsburgh Penguins || 3–3 || Carolina Hurricanes || 10–6–7 || 27
|-  style="background:#fcf;"
| 24 || 5 || Pittsburgh Penguins || 1–2 || Boston Bruins || 10–7–7 || 27
|-  style="background:#cfc;"
| 25 || 12 || Pittsburgh Penguins || 4–3 || St. Louis Blues || 11–7–7 || 29
|-  style="background:#cfc;"
| 26 || 15 || Tampa Bay Lightning || 2–2 OT || Pittsburgh Penguins || 12–7–7 || 31
|-  style="background:#fcf;"
| 27 || 16 || Pittsburgh Penguins || 1–4 || Florida Panthers || 12–8–7 || 31
|-  style="background:#cfc;"
| 28 || 19 || Washington Capitals || 0–0 || Pittsburgh Penguins || 13–8–7 || 33
|-  style="background:#fcf;"
| 29 || 21 || Pittsburgh Penguins || 1–7 || Toronto Maple Leafs || 13–9–7 || 33
|-  style="background:#fcf;"
| 30 || 22 || Los Angeles Kings || 3–3 || Pittsburgh Penguins || 13–10–7 || 33
|-  style="background:#cfc;"
| 31 || 26 || Ottawa Senators || 1–1 OT || Pittsburgh Penguins || 14–10–7 || 35
|-  style="background:#cfc;"
| 32 || 30 || Florida Panthers || 4–4 || Pittsburgh Penguins || 15–10–7 || 37
|-

|-  style="background:#cfc;"
| 33 || 2 || Pittsburgh Penguins || 4–2 || Florida Panthers || 16–10–7 || 39
|-  style="background:#cfc;"
| 34 || 5 || Calgary Flames || 1–1 || Pittsburgh Penguins || 17–10–7 || 41
|-  style="background:#cfc;"
| 35 || 7 || Carolina Hurricanes || 2–2 || Pittsburgh Penguins || 18–10–7 || 43
|-  style="background:#cfc;"
| 36 || 9 || St. Louis Blues || 1–1 || Pittsburgh Penguins || 19–10–7 || 45
|-  style="background:#fcf;"
| 37 || 13 || Pittsburgh Penguins || 3–5 || Phoenix Coyotes || 19–11–7 || 45
|-  style="background:#fcf;"
| 38 || 15 || Pittsburgh Penguins || 2–3 || San Jose Sharks || 19–12–7 || 45
|-  style="background:#cfc;"
| 39 || 16 || Pittsburgh Penguins || 5–1 || Los Angeles Kings || 20–12–7 || 47
|-  style="background:#fcf;"
| 40 || 18 || Pittsburgh Penguins || 3–5 || Mighty Ducks of Anaheim || 20–13–7 || 47
|-  style="background:#fcf;"
| 41 || 21 || New York Islanders || 5–5 || Pittsburgh Penguins || 20–14–7 || 47
|-  style="background:#fcf;"
| 42 || 26 || Carolina Hurricanes || 5–5 || Pittsburgh Penguins || 20–15–7 || 47
|-  style="background:#cfc;"
| 43 || 28 || Toronto Maple Leafs || 0–0 || Pittsburgh Penguins || 21–15–7 || 49
|-  style="background:#cfc;"
| 44 || 30 || Boston Bruins || 2–2 || Pittsburgh Penguins || 22–15–7 || 51
|-  style="background:#cfc;"
| 45 || 31 || Pittsburgh Penguins || 5–3 || Montreal Canadiens || 23–15–7 || 53
|-

|-  style="background:#cfc;"
| 46 || 2 || Buffalo Sabres || 3–3 || Pittsburgh Penguins || 24–15–7 || 55
|-  style="background:#cfc;"
| 47 || 5 || Florida Panthers || 0–0 || Pittsburgh Penguins || 25–15–7 || 57
|-  style="background:#cfc;"
| 48 || 7 || Detroit Red Wings || 1–1 || Pittsburgh Penguins || 26–15–7 || 59
|-  style="background:#cfc;"
| 49 || 9 || Montreal Canadiens || 2–2 OT || Pittsburgh Penguins || 27–15–7 || 61
|-  style="background:#cfc;"
| 50 || 11 || Vancouver Canucks || 5–5 OT || Pittsburgh Penguins || 28–15–7 || 63
|-  style="background:#cfc;"
| 51 || 13 || Pittsburgh Penguins || 3–2 OT || Nashville Predators || 29–15–7 || 65
|-  style="background:#cfc;"
| 52 || 15 || Washington Capitals || 3–3 || Pittsburgh Penguins || 30–15–7 || 67
|-  style="background:#fcf;"
| 53 || 17 || Pittsburgh Penguins || 1–3 || New York Islanders || 30–16–7 || 67
|-  style="background:#fcf;"
| 54 || 19 || Pittsburgh Penguins || 1–6 || New York Rangers || 30–17–7 || 67
|-  style="background:#fcf;"
| 55 || 21 || Pittsburgh Penguins || 1–2 || Philadelphia Flyers || 30–18–7 || 67
|-  style="background:#cfc;"
| 56 || 22 || Phoenix Coyotes || 1–1 || Pittsburgh Penguins || 31–18–7 || 69
|-  style="background:#cfc;"
| 57 || 25 || Pittsburgh Penguins || 3–2 || Colorado Avalanche || 32–18–7 || 71
|-  style="background:#fcf;"
| 58 || 26 || Pittsburgh Penguins || 4–6 || Dallas Stars || 32–19–7 || 71
|-  style="background:#fcf;"
| 59 || 28 || Pittsburgh Penguins || 3–4 || Washington Capitals || 32–20–7 || 71
|-

|-  style="background:#ffc;"
| 60 || 3 || Montreal Canadiens || 4–4 || Pittsburgh Penguins || 32–20–8 || 72
|-  style="background:#ffc;"
| 61 || 5 || Edmonton Oilers || 2–2 || Pittsburgh Penguins || 32–20–9 || 73
|-  style="background:#fcf;"
| 62 || 7 || Colorado Avalanche || 3–3 || Pittsburgh Penguins || 32–21–9 || 73
|-  style="background:#fcf;"
| 63 || 9 || New Jersey Devils || 3–3 || Pittsburgh Penguins || 32–22–9 || 73
|-  style="background:#cfc;"
| 64 || 10 || Pittsburgh Penguins || 3–2 OT || Carolina Hurricanes || 33–22–9 || 75
|-  style="background:#cfc;"
| 65 || 13 || Philadelphia Flyers || 0–0 || Pittsburgh Penguins || 34–22–9 || 77
|-  style="background:#ffc;"
| 66 || 16 || Dallas Stars || 2–2 || Pittsburgh Penguins || 34–22–10 || 78
|-  style="background:#cfc;"
| 67 || 17 || Pittsburgh Penguins || 2–0 || Tampa Bay Lightning || 35–22–10 || 80
|-  style="background:#ffc;"
| 68 || 20 || Nashville Predators || 1–1 || Pittsburgh Penguins || 35–22–11 || 81
|-  style="background:#ffc;"
| 69 || 21 || Pittsburgh Penguins || 2–2 || New York Rangers || 35–22–12 || 82
|-  style="background:#cfc;"
| 70 || 23 || Chicago Blackhawks || 2–2 || Pittsburgh Penguins || 36–22–12 || 84
|-  style="background:#fcf;"
| 71 || 25 || Pittsburgh Penguins || 3–5 || New Jersey Devils || 36–23–12 || 84
|-  style="background:#ffc;"
| 72 || 27 || Buffalo Sabres || 1–1 || Pittsburgh Penguins || 36–23–13 || 85
|-  style="background:#fcf;"
| 73 || 28 || Pittsburgh Penguins || 3–4 OT || Buffalo Sabres || 36–24–13 || 85
|-  style="background:#fcf;"
| 74 || 30 || Ottawa Senators || 6–6 || Pittsburgh Penguins || 36–25–13 || 85
|-

|-  style="background:#ffc;"
| 75 || 1 || Pittsburgh Penguins || 3–3 || Ottawa Senators || 36–25–14 || 86
|-  style="background:#fcf;"
| 76 || 3 || New Jersey Devils || 4–4 || Pittsburgh Penguins || 36–26–14 || 86
|-  style="background:#fcf;"
| 77 || 5 || Pittsburgh Penguins || 1–3 || Buffalo Sabres || 36–27–14 || 86
|-  style="background:#fcf;"
| 78 || 8 || Pittsburgh Penguins || 1–3 || Philadelphia Flyers || 36–28–14 || 86
|-  style="background:#cfc;"
| 79 || 11 || Pittsburgh Penguins || 3–0 || Detroit Red Wings || 37–28–14 || 88
|-  style="background:#fcf;"
| 80 || 15 || Pittsburgh Penguins || 2–4 || Boston Bruins || 37–29–14 || 88
|-  style="background:#fcf;"
| 81 || 17 || New York Islanders || 7–7 || Pittsburgh Penguins || 37–30–14 || 88
|-  style="background:#cfc;"
| 82 || 18 || Pittsburgh Penguins || 2–1 OT || New York Rangers || 38–30–14 || 90
|-

|- style="text-align:center;"
| Legend:       = Win       = Loss       = Tie

Playoffs 

|-  style="background:#fcf;"
| 1 || Apr 22 || Pittsburgh Penguins || 1–3 || New Jersey Devils || 0–1
|-  style="background:#cfc;"
| 2 || Apr 24 || Pittsburgh Penguins || 4–1 || New Jersey Devils || 1–1
|-  style="background:#cfc;"
| 3 || Apr 25 || New Jersey Devils || 2–4 || Pittsburgh Penguins || 2–1
|-  style="background:#fcf;"
| 4 || Apr 27 || New Jersey Devils || 4–2 || Pittsburgh Penguins || 2–2
|-  style="background:#fcf;"
| 5 || Apr 30 || Pittsburgh Penguins || 3–4 || New Jersey Devils || 2–3
|-  style="background:#cfc;"
| 6 || May 2 || New Jersey Devils || 2–3 OT || Pittsburgh Penguins || 3–3
|-  style="background:#cff;"
| 7 || May 4 || Pittsburgh Penguins || 4–2 || New Jersey Devils || 4–3
|-

|-  style="background:#cfc;"
| 1 || May 7 || Pittsburgh Penguins || 2–0 || Toronto Maple Leafs || 1–0
|-  style="background:#fcf;"
| 2 || May 9 || Pittsburgh Penguins || 2–4 || Toronto Maple Leafs || 1–1
|-  style="background:#cfc;"
| 3 || May 11 || Toronto Maple Leafs || 3–4 || Pittsburgh Penguins || 2–1
|-  style="background:#fcf;"
| 4 || May 13 || Toronto Maple Leafs || 3–2 OT || Pittsburgh Penguins || 2–2
|-  style="background:#fcf;"
| 5 || May 15 || Pittsburgh Penguins || 1–4 || Toronto Maple Leafs || 2–3
|-  style="background:#fcf;"
| 6 || May 17 || Toronto Maple Leafs || 4–3 OT || Pittsburgh Penguins || 2–4
|-

|- style="text-align:center;"
| Legend:       = Win       = Loss       = Playoff series win

Player statistics 
Skaters

Goaltenders

†Denotes player spent time with another team before joining the Penguins. Stats reflect time with the Penguins only.
‡Denotes player was traded mid-season. Stats reflect time with the Penguins only.

Awards and records

Transactions 
The Penguins have been involved in the following transactions during the 1998–99 season:

Trades

Free agents acquired

Free agents lost

Claimed via waivers

Lost via waivers

Player signings

Draft picks 

Pittsburgh Penguins' picks at the 1998 NHL Entry Draft.

Draft notes
 The Colorado Avalanche's third-round pick went to the Pittsburgh Penguins as a result of a September 28, 1997, trade that sent Francois Leroux to the Avalanche in exchange for this pick.
 The Pittsburgh Penguins' third-round pick went to the Edmonton Oilers as the result of an August 12, 1997, trade that sent Jiri Slegr to the Penguins in exchange for this pick.
 The Buffalo Sabres' fifth-round pick went to the Pittsburgh Penguins as a result of a September 24, 1997, trade that sent Jason Woolley to the Sabres in exchange for this pick.
 The Pittsburgh Penguins' fifth-round pick went to the Vancouver Canucks as the result of a March 18, 1997, trade that sent Josef Beranek to the Penguins in exchange for this pick.
 Compensatory pick received from NHL as compensation for free agent Craig Muni.

Farm teams 
The American Hockey League's Syracuse Crunch finished last overall in the standings with a record of 18-50-9-3.

See also 
 1998–99 NHL season

References 
Bibliography
 
 

P
P
Pittsburgh Penguins seasons
Pitts
Pitts